The 1946–47 Kentucky Wildcats men's basketball team represented University of Kentucky in intercollegiate basketball during the 1946–47 season. The team finished the season with 34–3 overall record and was retroactively named the national champion by the Premo-Porretta Power Poll.

References

Kentucky
Kentucky Wildcats men's basketball seasons
1946 in sports in Kentucky
1947 in sports in Kentucky